Aid Township is one of the fourteen townships of Lawrence County, Ohio, United States. The township had a population of 875 at the 2010 census.

Geography
Located in the northern part of the county, it borders the following townships:
Symmes Township - north
Walnut Township, Gallia County - northeast corner
Mason Township - east
Windsor Township - southeast corner
Lawrence Township - south
Elizabeth Township - west
Decatur Township - northwest

No municipalities are located in Aid Township.

Name and history
It is the only Aid Township statewide.

Government
The township is governed by a three-member board of trustees, who are elected in November of odd-numbered years to a four-year term beginning on the following January 1. Two are elected in the year after the presidential election and one is elected in the year before it. There is also an elected township fiscal officer, who serves a four-year term beginning on April 1 of the year after the election, which is held in November of the year before the presidential election. Vacancies in the fiscal officership or on the board of trustees are filled by the remaining trustees.

Education 
The majority of Aid Township's educational services are provided by the Symmes Valley Local School District (K-12), although portions of the township are educationally served by the Rock Hill Local School District (Pre-K-12).

Notable Person 
Simeon Slavens Willis - 46th Governor of Kentucky

References

External links
County website

Townships in Lawrence County, Ohio
Townships in Ohio